William Henry Belpitt (born May 3, 1860, date of death unknown) was a United States Navy sailor and a recipient of the United States military's highest decoration, the Medal of Honor.

Biography
Belpitt was born on May 3, 1859, in Ryde, New South Wales, Australia. On that morning, while Monocacy was at Fuzhou, China, he jumped overboard and rescued a Chinese man whose canoe had capsized. For this action, Belpitt was awarded the Medal of Honor.

Belpitt's official Medal of Honor citation reads:
On board the U.S.S. Monocacy, Foochow, China, 7 October 1884. Jumping overboard from that vessel on the morning of this date, Belpitt sustained, until picked up, a Chinaman who had been thrown into the water by the capsizing of a canoe.

Belpitt later returned to Australia, he died on 29 November 1912 at Rookwood, NSW and was buried at Rookwood Catholic Cemeteries and Crematoria on 2 December 1912.

See also

List of Medal of Honor recipients in non-combat incidents

References

1860 births
Year of death missing
People from Sydney
United States Navy sailors
United States Navy Medal of Honor recipients
Foreign-born Medal of Honor recipients
Non-combat recipients of the Medal of Honor